Emerson Ramon Bezerra Oliviera (born 24 November 2000), known as Emerson Negueba or just Negueba, is a Brazilian footballer who plays as a forward for CRB.

Club career
Later in the year, he moved to CSP and was initially assigned to the under-20 team.

Promoted to the first team of CSP for the 2020 season, Negueba featured rarely, and was loaned to Treze in January 2021. However, he only featured in one Copa do Brasil match before leaving in June.

After leaving Treze, Negueba signed for CRB and was initially assigned to the under-23 team. He made his first team debut on 22 July, coming on as a late substitute for Erik in a 1–1 Série B away draw against Coritiba.

Negueba scored his first professional goal on 25 July 2021, netting the opener in a 3–2 win at Sampaio Corrêa. On 23 December, he signed a permanent deal with the club until 2025.

Career statistics

Honours
CRB
Campeonato Alagoano: 2022

References

2000 births
Living people
Sportspeople from Paraíba
Brazilian footballers
Association football forwards
Campeonato Brasileiro Série B players
Centro Sportivo Paraibano players
Treze Futebol Clube players
Clube de Regatas Brasil players